Yehonatan Indursky (born 1984) is an Israeli filmmaker.

Career 
Yehonatan Indursky was born in Jerusalem, to an ultra-Orthodox Jewish (Haredi Jewish) family and studied at the Ultra Orthodox Yeshiva Ponevezh in Bnei Brak, Israel, and later at the Sam Spiegel Film and Television School, Jerusalem, Israel.

Filmography 
 "Driver" (Short, 2011) -  graduation movie in Sam Spiegel Film School. Won the Best Film and Best Acting Awards of the SSFS in 2011 and been selected to the Jerusalem Film Festival;
"" (2014) - Indursky's first full-length film: documentary, a rare and intimate look at one of Israel's leading yeshiva, Ponevezh Yeshiva, premiered in official competition in the Haifa Film Festival 2012 and was nominated for Best Documentary Film at the Israeli Academy Awards (Ophir);
 "The Cantor and the Sea" (Short, 2015);
 "Shtisel" (2013 - 2016) - as a screenwriter he created and wrote (with Ori Elon) the highly acclaimed Israeli drama series, Shtisel (in Hebrew שטיסל). In 2018 the series was broadcast on Netflix International.
 "Autonomies" (2018) -  A dystopian mini tv drama series about an alternate reality of present day Israel, a nation torn and divided by a wall between the secular capital of Tel Aviv, and the Haredi (ultra-Orthodox) Autonomy in Jerusalem. won Reflet d'Or, The Best International Television Series in Geneva International Film Festival 2018.
 "Driver" (2018) - an intimate exploration of lives at the fringes of Bnei Brak’s ultra-Orthodox community. The film won 3 prizes - Best Picture, Best actor and Best Screenplay from The Israeli Film Critics Forum  2018.

Awards 
 2011: The Best Film from Sam Spiegel Film and Television School for the "Driver";
 2013: The Best Debut Film Award from the Israeli Documentary Filmmakers Forum for "Ponevezh Time";
 2014: Warsaw Phoenix for the best documentary film, 10th International Film Festival Jewish Motifs for "Ponevezh Time".
 2015: The best director prize in Jerusalem Film Festival for "The cantor and the sea".
 2017: Israeli Television Academy Award for "Shtisel" (17 awards including "Best Series" and "Best Screenplay")
 2018: Reflet d'Or, The Best International Television Series in Geneva International Film Festival for "Autonomies".
 2018: Best film, Best actor and Best Screenplay for "Driver" from The Israeli Film Critics Forum.

References

External links

 
 Israeli TV show puts wall between secular and ultra-Orthodox Jews, The Guardian interview
 Seeing Inside the Israeli Ultra-Orthodox Community on the Netflix Series “Shtisel”, The New Yorker interview

Israeli film directors
1984 births
Living people
Ponevezh Yeshiva alumni
People from Jerusalem